William Irving Sirovich (March 18, 1882 – December 17, 1939) was an American physician and politician from New York. From 1927 to 1939, he served six terms in the U.S. House of Representatives.

Early life

Sirovich was born in 1882 in York County, Pennsylvania to Hungarian-Jewish immigrants Jacob and Rose Sirovich (née Weinstock). The family moved to New York City in 1888. Sirovich attended the public schools there and graduated from the College of the City of New York in 1902 and from the Columbia University College of Physicians and Surgeons in 1906. He commenced the practice of medicine in New York City in 1906 and also engaged as a lecturer, editor, and playwright, several of his plays being produced on Broadway.

Political career

In 1908 and 1910, he ran on the Independence League ticket for New York State Treasurer but was defeated by Republican Thomas B. Dunn (1908) and Democrat John J. Kennedy (1910).

He was a member of the fifth district school board from 1906 to 1926 and was appointed as a member of the commission to inquire into the subject of widows' pensions and of the State pension commission in 1913. He was appointed a member of the State charities convention in 1914 and served as superintendent of Peoples Hospital in New York City from 1910 to 1927. He was appointed commissioner of child welfare in 1919 and served until 1931; in 1924 he was an unsuccessful candidate for election to the 69th United States Congress.

Congress 
Sirovich was elected as a Democrat to the 70th, 71st, 72nd, 73rd, 74th, 75th and 76th United States Congresses, and served from March 4, 1927 until his death. During the 72nd through 76th Congresses he was Chairman of the Committee on Patents.

He was President of the Industrial National Bank in New York City from 1929 to 1932 and was a delegate to the Inter-Parliamentary Union Congress held at Bucharest, Romania, in 1931.

Death

Sirovich died in New York City in 1939. He was buried at the Mount Hebron Cemetery in Flushing.

See also
List of Jewish members of the United States Congress
List of United States Congress members who died in office (1900–49)

References

"Memorial services held in the House of Representatives of the United States, together with remarks presented in eulogy of William Irving Sirovich, late a representative from New York frontispiece 1941"

1882 births
1939 deaths
20th-century American dramatists and playwrights
20th-century American politicians
People from York County, Pennsylvania
City College of New York alumni
Columbia University Vagelos College of Physicians and Surgeons alumni
American people of Hungarian-Jewish descent
Jewish members of the United States House of Representatives
American bankers
Physicians from New York City
School board members in New York (state)
United States Independence Party politicians
Democratic Party members of the United States House of Representatives from New York (state)
Delegates to the Inter-Parliamentary Union Assembly
Burials at Mount Hebron Cemetery (New York City)